Lien is any sort of charge or encumbrance against an item of property that secures the payment of a debt.

Lien may also refer to:
 Maritime lien, maritime law term
 Mechanics lien, hold on real property for the benefit of someone whose work or property improves the property
 Tax lien, lien imposed on property by law to secure payment of taxes
 Le lien, the only novel by Vanessa Duriès

People with the surname
 Lien Chan, Taiwanese politician
 Alexian Lien, victim of Hollywood Stuntz gang assault
 Jennifer Lien, American actress
 Magnhild Lien, Norwegian mathematician

Characters with the given name
 Lien Hughes, character from the As the World Turns
 Lien Neville, character from the King of Fighters: Maximum Impact series
 Lien, a character in Order of the Stick
 Lien, a character and the pilot of God Erlang from Hero of Robots

See also
 Kim Lien (disambiguation)